Il Richiamo del ghiacciaio is a 1952 Italian film.

Cast

External links
 

1952 films
Italian drama films
1950s Italian-language films
1950s Italian films